The Financial Markets Authority (FMA) is the New Zealand government agency responsible for financial regulation.  It is responsible for regulating all financial market participants, exchanges and the setting and enforcing of financial regulations.

History

The authority was established on 1 May 2011 as part of the Financial Markets (Regulators and KiwiSaver) Bill which was passed by the New Zealand parliament on the 7 April 2011.  It was established in a wake of criticism over the failure of the previous regulatory regime to halt the failure of a large number of finance companies and to stem investor losses in the period between 2006 and 2010. It was introduced by Commerce Minister Simon Power, with him saying "This move is at the centre of the Government's drive to restore the confidence of mum and dad investors in our financial markets."

Structure
The FMA is controlled by a board appointed by the Minister of Commerce and run by chief executive Samantha Barrass. The board comprises chairman Mark Todd and members Christopher Swasbrook, Elizabeth Longworth, Kendall Flutey, Mark Weenink, Prasanna Gai, Sue Chetwin, Steven Bardy and Vanessa Stoddart.

Priorities 
The FMA's official website says its key statutory objective is "to promote and facilitate the development of fair, efficient, and transparent financial markets" and that it "will use the full range of its enforcement powers, targeting conduct that presents the greatest likelihood of harm to the function of open, transparent and efficient capital markets." Since it was established in 2011, it has been involved in legal action against Bridgecorp, KA Trustee Ltd, Perpetual, Hanover Finance, Lombard Finance, Sean Wood, Nathans Finance, Bernard Whimp and David Ross.

See also
Securities Commission
Finance company collapses, 2006-12 (New Zealand)

References

External links 
FMA official web site

New Zealand independent crown entities
Financial regulatory authorities of New Zealand